Kululu may refer to several places in Azerbaijan:

 Külüllü, Agsu (also Gülüllü and Kyulyulyu), a village in the Agsu Rayon
 Külüllü, Ismailli, a village in the municipality of İvanovka in the Ismailli Rayon
 Külüllü, Khizi, a village in the Khizi Rayon